Albert Ellis (1889–1961) was an English footballer who played for Stoke.

Career
Ellis was born in Manchester and played amateur football with Salford United before joining Stoke in 1910. He played in three first-team matches for Stoke during the 1913–14 season before returning to amateur football with Witton Albion.

Career statistics

References

1889 births
1961 deaths
Footballers from Manchester
English footballers
Association football forwards
Salford United F.C. players
Stoke City F.C. players
Witton Albion F.C. players